An enrober is a machine used in the confectionery industry to coat a food item with a coating medium, typically chocolate. Foods that are coated by enrobers include nuts, ice cream, toffee, chocolate bars, biscuits and cookies. Enrobing with chocolate extends a confection's shelf life.

The enrober machine was invented in France in 1903, brought to the United States, and perfected to perform the work of at least twenty people.

The process of enrobing involves placing the items on the enrober's feed band, which may consist of a wire mesh or containers in which the confection to be enrobed are placed, with each container having drain holes to recover excess chocolate. The enrober maintains the coating medium at a controlled constant temperature and pumps the medium into a flow pan. The medium flows from the flow pan in a continuous curtain and bottoming bed that the food items pass through, completely coating them. A wire mesh conveyor belt then transports the coated confection to a cooling area.

See also
 Sugar panning, a method to cover a candy or nut with a hard candy shell
 Couverture chocolate, a form of chocolate with a high proportion of cocoa butter, used in dipping and coating
 Compound chocolate, a chocolate substitute made from cocoa solids and various vegetable fats, often used by enrobers
 Food coating

References

External links
 Video of a chocolate enrober in operation

Chocolate
Chocolate industry
Food industry